Tomșani is a commune in Prahova County, Muntenia, Romania. It is composed of four villages: Loloiasca, Magula, Sătucu, and Tomșani.

Natives
 Alexandru Antemireanu (1877–1910), poet, prose writer, and literary critic

References

Communes in Prahova County
Localities in Muntenia